Little Black Bear 84SC is an Indian reserve of the Little Black Bear First Nation in Saskatchewan.

References

Indian reserves in Saskatchewan
Division No. 6, Saskatchewan
Little Black Bear First Nation